Soulos (Greek: Σούλος) is a village in the municipality of Megalopoli, Arcadia, Greece. It is situated on a hillside, 1 km north of Plaka, 2 km southeast of Katsimpalis, 2 km west of Nea Ekklisoula and 5 km northwest of Megalopoli.  The Greek National Road 76 (Megalopoli - Andritsaina - Krestena) passes east of the village.

Population

See also
List of settlements in Arcadia

References

External links
History and information about Soulos
 Soulos on GTP Travel Pages

Megalopolis, Greece
Populated places in Arcadia, Peloponnese